The Wakefield line is a railway line and service in the West Yorkshire Metro and South Yorkshire Passenger Transport Executive areas of northern England. The Wakefield line is coloured yellow on maps and publications by West Yorkshire Metro.  The line was electrified in 1989, between Leeds & Wakefield Westgate, as part of the programme to electrify the East Coast Main Line.

The service connects Leeds and Wakefield with Sheffield and Doncaster with the section of the line between Leeds and Doncaster forming part of the East Coast Main Line. The local stopping service is operated by Northern with services between Leeds, Wakefield and either Doncaster or Sheffield. Inter-city operators are London North Eastern Railway, East Midlands Railway and CrossCountry who provide services from Leeds to London and the South of England.

Some sections of the line are shared with the Huddersfield (orange) and Pontefract lines (light blue).

West Yorkshire "Metrocards" are available for all trains as far as South Elmsall on the Doncaster section of the line and to Moorthorpe on the Sheffield section.

Pre-nationalisation ownership
At the time of the 1923 Grouping the line was owned by different railway companies:
 Leeds Central–Wakefield 
Great Northern Railway (GNR) – with Wakefield Westgate station being jointly owned by the GNR and Great Central Railways (GCR).
 Wakefield–Doncaster 
West Riding and Grimsby Joint Railway (WRGJt) itself being of joint Great Northern Railway and Great Central Railway ownership.
 Moorthorpe–Swinton
Swinton & Knottingley Joint Railway itself being of joint Midland Railway (MidR) and North Eastern Railway (NER) ownership.
 Swinton–Sheffield 
Midland Railway (MidR)

The route
Trains on the line serve the following places; however, some stations have closed:

Leeds City–Fitzwilliam

 Beeston (closed)

Ardsley Tunnel
 Ardsley (closed)
 Outwood (formerly known as Lofthouse and Outwood)

At Outwood there were junctions with two joint undertakings; East & West Yorkshire Union (a short line connecting the Great Northern / Midland Railway main lines via Rothwell and Methley Joint Railway (owners being Great Northern, Lancashire and Yorkshire Railway and North Eastern Railway) connecting to various lines in the Castleford area.

Wrenthorpe Junction

From this junction was a line to Dewsbury which was partially closed in 1963 and complete closure came in 1965 – some artefacts still remain to this day.

 Wakefield Westgate 
 Sandal and Agbrigg (originally 'Sandal', closed 1957; reopened 1987 by British Rail with new name)
 Hare Park & Crofton (closed) 
Nostell North & South Junctions with Great Central Railway
 Nostell (closed) 
 Fitzwilliam (replaced an earlier station of the same name a short distance away)
 Hemsworth (closed)
Junction with the Hull and Barnsley Railway (HBR)

Junction with Sheffield branch to the south

Fitzwilliam–Doncaster
 South Elmsall
 Hampole (closed)
 Adwick (originally 'Carcroft & Adwick-le-Street' station, closed 1967; reopened by British Rail a short distance away with new name in 1993)
 Bentley
 Doncaster

Fitzwilliam–Swinton
Part of this section is also worked as the Dearne Valley line:
 Moorthorpe
 Frickley (closed)
Branch line to Frickley Colliery
 Thurnscoe 
Hickleton Junction for the Dearne Valley Railway (worked by the Lancashire & Yorkshire Railway)
 Goldthorpe
 Bolton-on-Dearne
Junction with the Great Central Railway Penistone–Doncaster line.
 Swinton

Swinton–Sheffield
From Swinton towards Sheffield, the Midland Railway and Great Central had parallel lines following the course of the River Don. The lines of the competing companies were so close that in 1965 British Railways built a new junction complex at Aldwarke and the current Wakefield Line now follows the former Great Central line to reach the reopened Rotherham Central. Intermediate stations were to be found at:
 Parkgate & Aldwarke (closed)
 Rotherham Road(closed)
 Rotherham Central
Taking a new curve, the line joins the Sheffield and Rotherham Railway.
 Meadowhall(opened 1990; replaced Wincobank railway station which closed in 1956 which was on same site)
 Brightside (closed)
Grimesthorpe Junction the line leaves the Sheffield & Rotherham and takes the Midland Railway line built in 1870. 
 Attercliffe Road(closed)
 Sheffield

Route maps of the route 1910–1913

See also
Metro (West Yorkshire PTE)
 Travel South Yorkshire (South Yorkshire PTE)

References

Rail transport in West Yorkshire
Rail transport in South Yorkshire
Rail transport in Sheffield
Transport in Leeds
Railway lines in Yorkshire and the Humber
Transport in the City of Wakefield